Tarrytown is a town in Montgomery County, Georgia, United States. The population was 66 at the 2020 census, down from 87 in 2010. It is part of the Vidalia Micropolitan Statistical Area.

History
A post office was established at Tarrytown in 1902. The Georgia General Assembly incorporated Tarrytown as a town in 1912.

Geography 
Tarrytown is located in northern Montgomery County at 32°19'9" North, 82°33'34" West (32.319181, -82.559323). The Treutlen County line passes just north of the town limits.

Georgia State Routes 15 and 29 pass through the center of town together, leading northwest  to Soperton and southeast  to Higgston.

Demographics 

As of the census of 2000, there were 100 people, 40 households, and 26 families residing in the town. The racial makeup of the town was 76% White, 23% African American, and 1% Native American.

There were 40 households, out of which 30.0% had children under the age of 18 living with them, 40.0% were married couples living together, 17.5% had a female householder with no husband present, and 35.0% were non-families. 30.0% of all households were made up of individuals, and 17.5% had someone living alone who was 65 years of age or older.  The average household size was 2.50 and the average family size was 3.19.

In the town the population was spread out, with 32.0% under the age of 18, 11.0% from 18 to 24, 20.0% from 25 to 44, 25.0% from 45 to 64, and 12.0% who were 65 years of age or older.  The median age was 32 years.  For every 100 females, there were 96.1 males.  For every 100 females age 18 and over, there were 78.9 males.

The median income for a household in the town was $21,667, and the median income for a family was $31,250. Males had a median income of $23,750 versus $13,750 for females. The per capita income for the town was $8,637.  41.6% of the population and 31.3% of families were below the poverty line, including 64.9% of those under the age of 18 and 50.0% of those 65 and older.

References

External links
 Tarrytown information at Georgia Municipal Association website
 

Towns in Montgomery County, Georgia
Towns in Georgia (U.S. state)
Vidalia, Georgia, micropolitan area